Val d'Europe is the easternmost part of the new town of Marne-la-Vallée, located around  to the east of Paris, France. The Walt Disney Company created the town near Disneyland Paris resort. The final area of the district is currently in development.

Description and history

Val d'Europe is made up of five communities, which have grouped together to form a town council. The five districts are:

Bailly-Romainvilliers
Chessy
Coupvray
Magny-le-Hongre
Serris

The area is primarily given over to Disneyland Park, as per the contract between the government and The Walt Disney Company. One of the terms was that the Euro Disney Resort (now Disneyland Paris) immediately got  of land to build Festival Disney (now named Disney Village).

The Walt Disney Company is the only company within France that has had such a large say in the development of an urban area of this scale. The government was represented by an EPA (governmental development company). Disney has also contributed to the development of the new town  Marne-la-Vallée.

The building work started in 1987, after Jacques Chirac (then French prime minister) and Disney signed the contract. Val d'Europe was to be opened with the Euro Disney Resort in 1992. 

It was not until the start of 1998 that Val d'Europe saw the opening of its shopping centre, which included a hypermarket and boutiques. However, a garden centre, Delbard, was opened in 2004 in a building to the south of the shopping centre.

The Walt Disney Company has spent €5 billion ($5.93 million/£3.42 million), compared to €500 million ($595,326,686/£342,080,667) from the French government.

The architectural style takes inspiration from the "neo-traditional" style of Baron Haussmann, who supervised the construction of many buildings in Paris in the 19th century. The town plan, by the firm of a Driehaus Prize winner, Cooper, Robertson & Partners of New York City, was designed based upon traditional French town planning principles consistent with the New Urbanism, a design philosophy which is frequently used in the United States and used with the intent to plan new cities based upon known working principles studied by architects. Disney had previously created a New Urbanist city in Florida, known as Celebration, also designed by Cooper, Robertson & Partners. It is believed that Val d'Europe and Celebration are descendants of Walt Disney's 1960s plans for the Experimental Prototype Community of Tomorrow (EPCOT), which was Walt Disney's original plan for a city of the future.

Shopping centre 

At the shopping centre there is a large Auchan hypermarket, 190 shops, and a food court known as "Les Terrasses." There is also a Sea Life aquarium indoors with about 300 species of marine creatures.

See also
 Golden Oak at Walt Disney World Resort, a concept high-end resort living community within the Walt Disney World resort
 Celebration, Florida, a census-designated place (CDP) and a master-planned community in Osceola County, Florida, United States, located near Walt Disney World Resort and originally developed by The Walt Disney Company.

References

External links

 SAN Val d'Europe official site
 Val d'Europe official site
 Val d'Europe Shopping Areas
 Val d'Europe Wins Award For Excellence
 Aquarium Sea Life official site
 Centre Commercial map
 Euro Disney SCA official site
 La Vallée Village official site
 SEA LIFE centre Paris Val d'Europe official website

 
New Urbanism communities
New Classical architecture